The Verbal Arts Centre is based in Derry, Northern Ireland, and is a centre for the development of the verbal arts and literacy (i.e. the ability to read, write, communicate and comprehend). It was established in 1992 as an educational charity. In 2000 it moved to the First Derry School, a listed building.

The project's goal is to promote the written and spoken word and is also involved in research and the publication and provision of information, including material for schools. It has also developed literacy building programmes for schools, works on literary heritage, storytelling and works also with youth and community groups throughout the north-west. The centre coordinates an annual comic book festival, the "2D Festival". It also promotes verbal arts events.

The centre publishes a bi-monthly, Verbal, which has a circulation of over 235,000 and is the largest free literary magazine in Ireland. Launched in January 2007 the publication covers books, authors, reading and the arts in general.

The centre hosts a readers circle and children's book club. The centre houses a number of arts and crafts pieces, including works by Louis le Brocquy and John Behan.

References

Education in Northern Ireland
Literature of Northern Ireland
Arts centres in Northern Ireland
Grade B1 listed buildings
Arts organizations established in 1992
1992 establishments in Northern Ireland